Konkomba is a Gurma language spoken in Ghana, Togo

Geography
Konkomba is spoken in Ghana (Northern Region, Volta Region, Brong Ahafo Region, Eastern Region and Accra), and Togo (Savanes Region, Kara Region and Plateaux Region).

Dialects and literature 
The Konkomba language, known natively as Likpakpaln, is spoken by the Konkomba people, who are also known as the Bikpakpaam. The Konkomba language has several dialects, including, but not limited to, Lichaboil, Ligbeln, Likoonli, Limonkpeln and Linafeel.

The dialects of Konkomba emerged because different families and groups settled together and adopted unique pronunciation and vocabulary patterns, forming what could be called uniform dialect groupings. For example, "map geek" in (in the Lichabol dialect), "may LAK Iya" (in the Limonkpeln dialect), and "many men" (in the Likoon dialect) all mean "I don't like that". This type of variation can be heard in Likpakpaln, depending on the geographic area or what clan is dominant in a particular settlement. However, Lichaboil dialect is the written variety. Other Bikpakpaam dialects classifications include Linankpel (Nankpantiib), Likpalil (Bikpalib), Linandeln (Binandim), Lisagmaln (Sagmantiib), and Linalol (Binalob).

A reasonable amount of Likpakpaln literature exists. This literature includes primers for teaching, a dictionary, storybooks, and folk tales. There is also a full translation of the Bible in Likpakpaln, created through the work of GILLBT and GIL, Mary Steele, and RILADEP (formerly KOLADEP, Konkomba Literacy and Development Project). Work on the Likpakpaln Bible translation was started by Mary Steele in 1962 when she arrived to work with the Wycliffe Bible Translators.

Classification
Konkomba is a Gur language. It is related to the Bimoba language spoken by the Bimoba people of Ghana, to the Moba language spoken by the Moba people of Togo and Burkina Faso, and to the Bassari language spoken by the Bassari people of Togo and Ghana. It is part of the Gurma subgroup, which also includes several other languages such as Gourmanche and Miyobe.

Orthography

Alphabet

Capital letters 
A, B, (C), CH, D, E, F, G, GB, I, J, K, KP, L, M, N, NY, Ŋ, ŊM, O, Ɔ, P, R, S, T, U, W, Y.

Lower-case letters 
a, b, (c), ch, d, e, f, g, gb, i, j, k, kp, l, m, n, ny, ŋ, ŋm, o, ɔ, p, r, s, t, u, w, y.

The orthography follows that used in the literature currently in print in Likpakpaln. Under the current convention, long and short vowels are distinguished by the use of single and double letters respectively. (e.g. a, aa). Tone is not marked, but where two words contrast only in tone and the context is unlikely to indicate a distinction in meaning, an "h" is added after the vowel in one of the words (e.g. upii – woman, upiih – sheep).

Certain variations that may occur in the a given speaker's speech. For example, sometimes a speaker may use the /r/ sound and sometimes the /l/ sound. Also, there may be variations between one speaker and another within the same village (e.g. some use the plural tiib and some teeb). This is, however, at the phonological level and does not affect semantic interpretation.

The letter c outside the digraph ch is listed by GILLBT's Likpakpaani Dictionary, but not in other sources.

Phonology 
Letters and sounds are organized as shown below. The format shows a Roman Alphabet letter, followed by a similar sound in English, followed by an example showing a Likpakpaln word containing a similar sound, followed by the meaning of the word in English.
a (as in father) e.g.: n-na (my mother)                 
b (as in boy) e.g. ubo (a child)
ch (as in church) e.g. chapiln (forgive)
d (as in dog) e.g. da (buy)
e (eight) e.g. kpe	(add)
f (as in fish) e.g. falaa (suffering) 
g (as in go) e.g. gaa (take)
gb (there is no similar sound in English) e.g. gbi (dig)
h (as in hat) e.g. haali (even)	
I (as in feet) e.g. ipii (sheep) 
j (as in Jack) e.g. kijuk (knife)
k (as in kitchen) e.g. kiyiik (calabash)
kp (there is no similar sound in English) e.g. uninkpil (elder/chief/boss)
l (as in lady) e.g. lafee (health)
m (as in man) e.g. limual (a river)
n (as in net) e.g. linuul (Yam)
ŋ ( as in sin'''g''' e.g. ŋaan (cook/boil)
ŋm (there is no similar sound in English, the closest however is the sound of a kiss, gmmmmaaaaaaaa) e.g. ŋmɔ (Chew)
ny (there is no similar sound in English but there is a similar sound in French as in igname (yam)) e.g. nya (go out/get out)
o (as in no) e.g. lijol (mountain/plateau/highland)
ɔ (as in paw/log/ball/pawpaw) e.g. mɔk (show/teach)
p (as in pick) e.g. paacham (up/above/on top)
r (as in rock) e.g. ipaar (benefit/profit)
s (as in sit) e.g. kisaak (a farm) 
t (as in tip) e.g. litakpaal (a stone/rock)
u (as in loop) e.g. likuul (a hoe/a tape/CD/DVD) 
w (as in wish) e.g. Uwumbɔr (God)
y (as in yes) e.g. liyimbil (a name).

Vowels 
The vowels are: a, e, i, o, ɔ, u.

Grammar

Lexical Tone
Differences in tone can change the lexical function of a particular word. In contrast to many other Gur languages, Likpakpaln tones have no grammatical function.

Grammatical Tone
There are two-level tones; low (⸜) and high (⸝), which are used to distinguish between perfective and habitual aspects. The tones do not change regardless of the person specification of the noun or a pronoun.

Noun Class System

Pronouns

Personal Pronouns

Personal pronouns can either occur preverbally or postvebally. In both cases, there is an additional distinction in the third person with regard to animacy. 

Preverbal

Preverbal personal pronouns are used as subjects. Which form for the first person pronoun is used, depends on the phonology of the following word.

Postverbal

Postverbal personal pronouns are used as objects.

Emphatic Pronouns
Emphatic pronouns are formed by a personal pronoun and an additional suffix. This suffix is in singular -ìn or -mà, whereas in the plural the suffix is -mì or -mà.

Reciprocal Pronouns
There is only one reciprocal pronoun tͻb in Likpakpaln.

Reflexive Pronouns
Rflexive pronouns are formed by the personal pronouns, to which the suffix -bà ('self') is attached to.

Possessive Pronouns
Possessive pronouns in Likpakpaln have the same morphological form than the preverbal personal pronouns. In special contexts, the prefix -aa can be attached to the possessum in order to emphasize the relation between the possessor and the possessum.

Relative Pronouns
Relative pronouns are dependent on the prefix of the noun that indicates its noun class. The relative pronoun is thus a reflection of the noun class and functions as a resumptive pronoun.

Demonstrative Pronouns
Demonstrative pronouns are formed by the noun class prefix of the particular noun and the suffix -mìnà. Likpakpaln makes a distinction between proximal and distal demonstratives.

Syntax

Word Order
Likpakpaln is a Subject–verb–object language.

Verb Phrase
The VP consists of the main verb and preverbal particles encoding Tense, Aspect and Mood.

Preverbal Particles
Aspectual Particles

There is a distinction between perfective and imperfective aspect. The perfective is not explicitly marked, while the imperfective is expressed by the particle -bì.

Tense Particles

There are five distinct tense forms that are morphologically realized by an individual particle. Likpakpaln marks immediate past (bà), remote past (nàn), hesternal past (fè), future (gà) and negative future (ààn). The particles for the particular tense form also immediately precede the verb.

Verb
Main verbs in Likpakpaln do not morphologically inflect, therefore there is no grammatical agreement.

Questions
There are different options how to form a question. The question word can either occur clause-initially, which is also referred to as ex situ, or it can stay in situ, meaning that it occurs at the end of the clause. Moreover, a question can also be embedded in a subordinated clause and a question can also have more than one question word.

Sample text in Likpakpaln  
The following is a sample portion of the Holy Bible translated into Likpakpaln, along with the corresponding passage in English:

See also
Konkomba people
Languages of Ghana

References

 Typological features
 Anne Schwarz, "[How many focus markers are there in Konkomba www.lingref.com/cpp/acal/38/paper2146.pdf]"
 Tait, David. 1954. "Konkomba nominal classes" (with a phonetic commentary by P. D. Strevens). Africa, v. 24, p. 130–148.

Languages of Ghana
Languages of Togo
Gurma languages